Chryseobacterium gallinarum  is a Gram-negative and rod-shaped bacteria from the genus of Chryseobacterium which has been isolated from the pharyngeal scrape of a chicken in Saxony-Anhalt in Germany. Chryseobacterium gallinarum has the ability to degrade keratin.

References

Further reading

External links
Type strain of Chryseobacterium gallinarum at BacDive -  the Bacterial Diversity Metadatabase

gallinarum
Bacteria described in 2014